Jonathan Lynn Griffiths (born 23 August 1964) is a Welsh former rugby union, and professional rugby league footballer who played as a  or  in the 1980s and 1990s.

Griffiths attained his first cap for the Wales national rugby union team 11 June 1988 versus New Zealand.

Griffiths was a Great Britain and Wales international and played at the 1995 Rugby League World Cup.

Jonathan Griffiths played  in St. Helens 4–5 defeat by Wigan in the 1992 Lancashire County Cup Final during the 1992–93 season at Knowsley Road, St. Helens on Sunday 18 October 1992.

As of 2013, Griffith's is a fireman in Pembrokeshire and a practising Christian.

References

External links
!Great Britain Statistics at englandrl.co.uk (statistics currently missing due to not having appeared for both Great Britain, and England)
(archived by web.archive.org) World Cup 1995 details
Profile at saints.org.uk

1964 births
Living people
Great Britain national rugby league team players
Llanelli RFC players
Rugby league five-eighths
Rugby league halfbacks
Rugby league players from Carmarthenshire
Rugby union players from Carmarthen
St Helens R.F.C. players
Wales international rugby union players
Wales national rugby league team players
Welsh rugby league players
Welsh rugby union players